The following is a list of notable deaths in June 1998.

Entries for each day are listed alphabetically by surname. A typical entry lists information in the following sequence:
 Name, age, country of citizenship at birth, subsequent country of citizenship (if applicable), reason for notability, cause of death (if known), and reference.

June 1998

1
Emery Barnes, 68, American-Canadian gridiron football player and politician.
Rex Bumgardner, 74, American gridiron football player.
Gottfried Dienst, 78, Swiss football referee.
Junkyard Dog, 45, American professional wrestler, traffic collision.
Shigeo Fukushima, 55, Japanese swimmer and Olympian.
Godfrey Grayson, 84, English film director.
Darwin Joston, 60, American actor (Assault on Precinct 13, Eraserhead, The Fog), leukemia.
Bishambhar Nath Pande, 91, Indian freedom fighter, social worker, and politician.
José Pedraza, 60, Mexican race walker and Olympic medalist.
Jerzy Łoś, 78, Polish mathematician, economist, and philosopher.

2
Daniel I. Axelrod, 87, American paleoecologist, heart attack.
Helen Carter, 70, American country music singer, heart problems.
P. Andrew Cooray, 96, Sri Lankan politician.
Oran Henderson, 77, United States Army officer associated with the Mỹ Lai massacre, pancreatic cancer.
Ricky Hyslop, 83, Canadian violinist, conductor, composer, and arranger.
Brian Johnston, 64, New Zealand field hockey player and Olympian.
Gonzalo Martínez Ortega, 64, Mexican actor, screenwriter and producer, traffic collision.
Dorothy Stickney, 101, American actress.

3
Pat Abbruzzi, 65, American gridiron football player.
Poul Bundgaard, 75, Danish actor and singer, kidney failure.
Lucien Conein, 78, French-born U.S. Army officer and OSS/CIA operative, heart failure.
Douglas Gretzler, 47, American serial killer, execution by lethal injection.
Joseph C. Harsch, 93, American journalist.
Ernest Henry, 94, Australian freestyle swimmer and Olympic medalist.
William L. Snyder, 80, American film producer, Alzheimer's disease.

4
Aarudhra, 72, Indian author, poet, publisher, and playwright.
Fred Burchell, 67, Canadian ice hockey player.
Clancy Carlile, 68, American novelist and screenwriter, cancer.
Philippe Charbonneaux, 81, French industrial designer.
Josephine Hutchinson, 94, American actress.
Ray Montgomery, 76, American actor.
Miguel Montuori, 65, Italian Argentine football player.
Shirley Povich, 92, American journalist.
David Walsh, 52, Canadian businessman, aneurysm.

5
Alfred Kazin, 83, American writer and literary critic.
Viola Keats, 87, British actress.
Jeanette Nolan, 86, American actress, stroke.
Dieter Roth, 68, Swiss artist, heart attack.
B. M. Shah, Indian theatre director and playwright.
Prentiss Walker, 80, American politician.
Sam Yorty, 88, American politician, stroke.

6
Georg Bayerer, 83, German football player and coach.
Louie Bickerton, 95, Female tennis player from Australia.
Marshall Green, 82, American diplomat.
Jatoe Kaleo, Ghanaian ruler and politician.
Svend S. Schultz, 84, Danish composer and conductor.
Peter Wong, 66, Canadian politician, heart attack.

7
Tom Buskey, 51, American baseball player, complications from heart attack.
James Byrd Jr., 49, African American racism victim, murdered.
Jerry Capehart, 69, American songwriter and music manager.
Wally Gold, 70, American musician and music business executive, colitis.
Hans Ramberg, 81, Norwegian-Swedish geologist.

8
Sani Abacha, 54, Nigerian Army officer and dictator, poisoned.
Harry Lookofsky, 84, American jazz violinist.
Jackie McGlew, 69, South African cricket player.
Michael John O'Brian, 70, Pakistan Air Force officer.
Maria Reich, 95, German-Peruvian mathematician and archaeologist, ovarian cancer.
Larisa Yudina, 52, Soviet and Russian journalist and newspaper editor, homicide.

9
Agostino Casaroli, 83, Italian Catholic priest and diplomat for the Holy See.
Loïs Mailou Jones, 92, American artist and teacher.
Edmund Koller, 67, West German bobsledder and Olympian.
Barton Holland Warnock, 86, American botanist, heart attack.

10
Paudge Brennan, 76, Irish politician.
Bobby Bryant, 64, American jazz trumpeter and flugelhornist, heart attack.
Leroy Chollet, 74, American basketball player.
David English, 67, British journalist and newspaper editor.
Fernando Germani, 92, Italian organist of the St. Peter's Basilica in Rome.
Steve Griffiths, 84, English footballer.
Jim Hearn, 77, American baseball player.
Hammond Innes, 84, English author.
Nivedita Jain, 19, Indian beauty contestant and actress, complications after fall.
Steve Sanders, 45, American musician, singer and songwriter, suicide.
John G. Smith, 73, American baseball coach, pneumonia.

11
Thomas Abernethy, 95, American politician.
Harry Anderson, 66, American baseball player.
Catherine Cookson, 91, British author.
Gevorg Emin, 78, Armenian poet, essayist, and translator.
Jacques Emmanuel, 78, French actor, screenwriter and librettist.
Alexei Eriomin, 79, Soviet and Russian realist painter.
Jože Privšek, 61, Slovene jazz and pop musician.
Leopoldo Salcedo, 86, Filipino film actor.
Lucia Valentini Terrani, 51, Italian coloratura mezzo-soprano, leukemia.

12
Leo Buscaglia, 74, American author and motivational speaker, heart attack.
John Gutmann, 93, German-American photographer and painter.
Charles "Teenie" Harris, 90, American photographer.
Jon Leirfall, 98, Norwegian politician.
Theresa Merritt, 75, American actress (That's My Mama, The Wiz, Billy Madison) and singer, skin cancer.
Paul Michael Stephani, 53, American serial killer, skin cancer.
Richard Thompson, 83, American animator.
Lucienne Velu, 96, French athlete, basketball player and Olympian.

13
Nisim Aloni, 71, Israeli playwright and translator.
Lucio Costa, 96, Brazilian architect and urban planner.
Gil Duthie, 86, Australian politician.
Buddy Elrod, 79, American football player.
Alfred Horace Gerrard, 99, English modernist sculptor.
Birger Ruud, 86, Norwegian ski jumper.
Fernand Sastre, 74, French football official, cancer.
Kadamba Simmons, 24, British actress and model, murdered.
Reg Smythe, 80, British cartoonist (Andy Capp), lung cancer.
Yoshio Sugino, 93, Japanese martial artist and film choreographer.
Éric Tabarly, 86, French naval officer and yachtsman, drowned.
Henry Tatana, 53, New Zealand rugby player.

14
Camillo Achilli, 76, Italian footballer.
Hans W. Brimi, 80, Norwegian farmer and traditional folk musician.
Ginette Mathiot, 91, French food writer.
Oliver Treyz, 80, American network television executive.

15
Hartmut Boockmann, 63, German historian.
Suzanne Eisendieck, 91, German painter.
Jason Holliday, 74, American hustler and nightclub performer.
Morris Kestelman, 92, British artist.
Thierry Salmon, 41, Belgian actor and theatre director, traffic accident.
Anton van Wilderode, 79, Belgian priest, writer and poet.

16
Roberto Cañedo, 80, Mexican actor.
Lewis Leonard Forman, 68, British botanist.
Jorge Toriello Garrido, 90, Guatemalan politician and President of Guatemala.
Frank Kristufek, 82, American football player.
Keith Newton, 56, English footballer, laryngeal cancer.
Ricardo Núñez, 93, Spanish actor, screenwriter, producer and film director.
Jafar Sharif-Emami, 85, Iranian politician.
Fred Wacker, 79, American businessman and racecar driver.

17
John Carberry, 93, American Roman Catholic prelate.
Dina de Marco, 60, Mexican actress and television director, cancer.
Aage Eriksen, 81, Norwegian Greco-Roman wrestler and Olympic medalist.
Joe Kelly, 91, Australian rules football player and coach.
Carlos Loredo, 46, Cuban football player and Olympian.
Gianni Lunadei, 60, Italian-Argentine actor, suicide.
Gyula László, 88, Hungarian historian, archaeologist and artist.
Muhammad Metwally Al Shaarawy, 87, Egyptian Muslim jurist.

18
Otto Baum, 86, German commander of the Waffen-SS during World War II.
André Chorda, 60, French football player.
Archie Edwards, 79, American blues guitarist.
Edward Eliscu, 96, American lyricist, playwright, producer and actor.
Ernesto Grillo, 68, Argentine footballer, pancreatic cancer.
Kim Jin-kyu, 76, South Korean actor, film director and producer, cancer.
Felix Knight, 89, American tenor, actor, and vocal teacher.
Charles Korvin, 90, Hungarian-born American actor, photographer and master chef.
Adel Osseiran, 93, Lebanese statesman and founding father of the Lebanese Republic.
Nazim Panipati, Pakistani film song lyricist and film script writer.
Karl-Heinz Spikofski, 71, German football player and coach.
Herbert J. Sweet, 78, United States Marine Sergeant Major, respiratory failure.
Paul van Buren, 74, American theologian and author, cancer.

19
John Camkin, 75, English journalist and sports commentator, cancer.
Novice Gail Fawcett, 89, American academic administrator.
Anatoly Kasheida, 69, Soviet and Ukrainian writer, poet, and journalist.
Howard J. Whitmore, Jr., 93, American politician.

20
Bruno Barnabe, 93, English film and stage actor.
Ernst Brugger, 84, Swiss politician .
Robert James Clayton, 82, English electronics engineer.
Heinz Ditgens, 83, German football player and manager.
Per Anders Fogelström, 80, Swedish writer.
Bobby Gimby, 79, Canadian orchestra leader, trumpeter, and singer-songwriter.
Kali, 79, Polish-American painter.
Elio Ragni, 87, Italian athlete.
Conrad Schumann, 56, East German border guard, suicide by hanging.
George Van Peursem, American politician.

21
Harry Cranbrook Allen, 81, British historian of the United States.
Anastasio Ballestrero, 84, Italian Roman Catholic cardinal.
Al Campanis, 81, American baseball executive.
Emma Danieli, 61, Italian actress and television personality.
Gerhard Gundermann, 43, German singer-songwriter and rock musician, stroke.
François Lehideux, 94, French industrialist and member of the Vichy government.
Peter Mander, 69, New Zealand yachtsman and Olympic gold medal winner.
Elio Morille, 70, Italian rower and Olympic champion.
Tom Smith, 88, Scottish football player and manager.

22
Phil Campbell, 81, American farmer and politician.
Brian Davis, 63, New Zealand Anglican archbishop.
Juliusz Bogdan Deczkowski, 74, Polish soldier during World War II, and later inventor and writer.
Benny Green, 70, British writer, radio broadcaster and saxophonist, cancer.
Norberto Doroteo Méndez, 75, Argentine football player.

23
Leonard Jones, 74, Canadian lawyer and politician.
Kurt Kren, 68, Austrian avant-garde filmmaker.
Ida Krottendorf, 71, Austrian actress, cancer.
Bill Lee, 86, American gridiron football player.
Paul O'Dwyer, 90, Irish-American politician and lawyer.
Maureen O'Sullivan, 87, American actress, heart attack.

24
Francine Agazarian, 85, French spy during World War II.
Canito, 67, Spanish footballer.
Beatrice Mandelman, 85, American abstract artist, cancer.
Henry G. Saperstein, 80, American film producer and distributor.

25
David Ayalon, 84, Israeli historian of Islam and the Middle East.
Hans Friedrich, 81, German politician and member of the Bundestag.
Arthur Lewis, 81, British politician.
Lounès Matoub, 42, Algerian Berber singer, poet and political activist, assassinated.
Jirō Takamatsu, 62, Japanese artist.

26
Pierre Angénieux, 90, French engineer and optician.
Frank Arkell, 62, Australian politician, murdered.
John Malcolm Brinnin, 81, Canadian-American poet and literary critic.
Bobby Cairns, 69, Scottish football player.
Sero Khanzadyan, 82, Armenian writer.
Vladimir Petukhov, 48, Russian mayor of Nefteyugansk, killed.
Luciano Pezzi, 77, Italian road bicycle racer.
Derek Rayner, Baron Rayner, 72, English businessman and life peer.
Hacı Sabancı, 63, Turkish businessman and philanthropist, lung cancer.
Dick Schulz, 81, American basketball player.
William R. Sears, 70, American politician.

27
Pierre Boutang, 81, French philosopher, poet and translator.
David Laitt, 67, English cricketer.
Sumati Morarjee, 91, Indian businessman.
Gilles Rocheleau, 62, Canadian politician.
Homi J.H. Taleyarkhan, 86, Indian politician and Gandhian.
Joyce Wieland, 67, Canadian experimental visual artist, Alzheimer's disease.
Peter H. Wyden, 74, American journalist and writer.

28
Jonathan Benair, 47, American actor (The Brave Little Toaster), cerebral hemorrhage and heart attack.
Marion Eugene Carl, 82, American flying ace during World War II and record-setting test pilot, shot during robbery.
Bill Elias, 75, American football coach.
Božidar Ferjančić, 69, Serbian historian.
Louis Hostin, 90, French weightlifter and Olympic champion.
Glenn Montgomery, 31, American gridiron football player, ALS.
Brita Collett Paus, 80, Norwegian humanitarian leader.
Jean-Yves Raimbaud, 40, French animator and cartoonist, lung cancer.
Jack Rowley, 79, English footballer.
Birger Sandberg, 80, Swedish football player and manager.
Kamala Sohonie, 85, Indian biochemist.
Denis Williams, 75, Guyanese painter, author and archaeologist.

29
Slavko Dokmanović, 48, Croatian Serbian war criminal, suicide by hanging.
Joseph G. Galway, 75, American meteorologist.
Jess Hahn, 76, American-French actor.
Horst Jankowski, 62, German classical pianist, lung cancer.
Küllo Kõiv, 25, Estonian wrestler, car accident.
Kamalakara Kameshwara Rao, 86, Indian film director, cardiac arrest.
Frank Rowlett, 90, American cryptologist.

30
Galina Brezhneva, 69, Soviet and Russian socialite and daughter of General Secretary Leonid Brezhnev, cerebrovascular disease.
Renato Capecchi, 74, Italian baritone, actor, and opera director.
Giorgio Carpi, 89, Italian football player.
George Parsons, 84, Canadian ice hockey player.
John Peter, 61, Indian field hockey player.
Bob Pryde, 85, Scottish football player.

References 

1998-06
 06